The Murder of Mia Valentin was a fatal stabbing on 27 December 2017 in the town of Kandel in Rhineland-Palatinate, Germany. An Afghan asylum seeker, who had been denied refugee status, was charged with the murder of his 15-year-old German former girlfriend, allegedly after she ended the relationship. The case was reported in the national and international press and sparked a political debate about the German refugee policies, especially how to deal with underage unaccompanied refugees.

Incident 
Mia Valentin was murdered on 27 December 2017 in a drugstore in the town of Kandel. The murderer, Abdul Dawodzai, a former refugee claimant from Afghanistan, had been placed in the same class as Valentin.  Dawoodzai and Valentin had had a relationship for several months. In the beginning of December 2017, after she had ended the relationship, he allegedly began to threaten Valentin. She and her parents made complaints to the police in mid-December. On the morning of 27 December 2017, police officers had visited the perpetrator. Later that day, he stabbed Valentin after he followed her into the store, using a 20 cm knife. She died shortly afterwards in hospital.  The suspect allegedly bought the knife at the same store just before he attacked her.

On 15 December 2017, the victim's parents had filed a criminal complaint, alleging that suspect had slandered and threatened their daughter.

Perpetrator 
The perpetrator was named as Abdul Mobin Dawodzai from Afghanistan. He came to Germany in April 2016 and initially resided in Frankfurt, later in a center for young refugees in Germersheim. His asylum claim was rejected in February 2017, but he was not deported. The parents of the victim strongly doubted that he was only 15 years old, so an investigation was launched to determine his true age. The perpetrator had been known to the police for a serious bodily injury crime committed in school.

Legal proceedings 
The suspect was charged with murder, and underwent a medical examination in response to allegations that he misstated his age. The age assessment was carried out by evaluating X-rays of hand, clavicle and dentition of the suspect. The findings of the examination were presented by the State's attorney in February 2018. These findings concluded that the suspect was at least 17 years and six months old, but most likely around 20.

He was tried as a minor. Dawodzai's lawyer denied he was older than 20. The prosecution called for a 10 year sentence while the defense attorney asked for a 7.5 year sentence.

On 3 September 2018, Dawodzai was sentenced to 8 years and 6 months in prison for murder of Valentin. Maximilian Ender, Dawodzai's lawyer called the sentenced "correct" and said that his client had accepted the verdict. Locals protested outside the court calling the sentence of 8.5 years for murder too short.

Aftermath

Political debate 
The murder reignited German public debate over refugee policy, in particular, debate over abuse of refugee policy by adult men claiming to be child refugees.

Several politicians of FDP, CDU, CSU, AfD, SPD and also Green parties demanded a better control of young unaccompanied refugees as a consequence of the case. The authorities of Rhineland-Palatinate began an investigation to determine consequences. Julia Klöckner (CDU) offered condolences to the parents of Mia Valentin and demanded an investigation, as did Eva Högl (SPD). Stephan Mayer (CSU) demanded a hardened course against underage offenders. Alexander Gauland (AfD) stated that the German policies of open borders were responsible for the case. Konstantin von Notz (The Greens) demanded a better prevention and a closer look to the underage unaccompanied refugees. The Interior Minister of Bavaria, Joachim Herrmann (CSU) demanded an age test for all underage refugees who were not clearly recognizable as children. FDP chairman Christian Lindner suggested faster deportation of underage criminal asylum seekers.

Annegret Kramp-Karrenbauer, Minister President of Saarland spoke out in favor of obligatory age tests of young refugees, as did the Deutscher Städte- und Gemeindebund. Official investigations in some German states showed, that at least 30 to 50 percent of the age records of alleged underage refugees are wrong.

Unlike other German TV news broadcasters, news magazine Tagesschau did not report the case at first, later explaining that it does not normally report on domestic crime, especially where children are involved. After criticism in social media, the paper published a report.

Protests 
Two months after the attack there were demonstrations in the town, involving over a thousand people. The local authorities claimed that most of the anti-immigration demonstrators were not from Kandel and that the town was being used as a "platform" by right-wingers. A separate group simultaneously demonstrated against racism.

Funeral candles with pictures of Mia Valentin along with photos of Mireille B murdered 2018 in Flensburg and Maria Ladenburger murdered in 2016 in Freiburg were placed by anti-Islamic protesters outside chancellor Angela Merkel's office in Stralsund.

Kandel Is Everywhere
Following Mia's murder, an initiative entitled "Kandel Is Everywhere" took root in Germany. It has held protests, created Stolpersteine decrying the murders of Germans by foreigners, and produced a poster that went viral that includes Mia and Susanna Feldmann, under the heading “Merkel’s Stolpersteine.”

Suicide
On 10 October 2019, it was announced that Abdul D. had been found dead in his cell, of apparent suicide.

Trial and sentence
Because of the youth of the accused, the case was heard privately in a juvenile court. Anti-immigration demonstrators assembled in the streets of Kandel in September 2018 to await the announcement of the verdict, with counter-protests from locals. When the sentence of 8 years in prison for the convicted murderer was announced, Deutsche Welle noted that the social media accounts of Alternative for Germany politicians "lit up" with criticism of the brevity of the sentence, while members of the governing Social Democratic Party were silent. A political consultant said that #Kandel had enabled the right wing to "take a singular, exceptional event and "abstract" it into a national problem".

Documentary The Girl and the Refugee
The documentary The Girl and the Refugee, which is Episode 5 of the series What Moves Germany, was shown on 4 June 2018 on Das Erste, a public television channel in Germany. The documentary is about the Kandel murder by stabbing of Mia Valentin, and about the attempted murder by stabbing five days earlier of a 17-year-old girl by another Afghan refugee in Darmstadt. Looking for answers, the filmmakers travel to Afghanistan where they are told that a woman who separates from her man "must be killed."  The documentary is an hr-SWR co-production, directed by Christian Gropper and Kai Diezemann.

See also
 Immigration and crime in Germany
 Reutlingen knife attack
 Murder of Mireille B
 Murder of Maria Ladenburger

References 

2017 murders in Germany
2010s trials
21st century in Rhineland-Palatinate
Crime in Rhineland-Palatinate
Deaths by person in Germany
Deaths by stabbing in Germany
December 2017 crimes in Europe
December 2017 events in Germany
Female murder victims
Germersheim (district)
Murder trials
Murdered German children
Stabbing attacks in 2017
Stabbing attacks in Germany
Trials in Germany
Violence against women in Germany
Incidents of violence against girls